SS Donau was a Norddeutscher Lloyd refrigerated cargo ship. In the Second World War the Kriegsmarine used it as a transport ship between Germany and Norway. She became known as the "slave ship" after the SS and Gestapo transported 540 Jews from Norway to Stettin, from where they were taken by train to Auschwitz. Only nine of those deported on the Donau survived.

History
Donau was built in Hamburg for Norddeutscher Lloyd of Bremen and completed in 1929. At 9,035 gross register tons she was large for her time, and she was unusual amongst cargo ships for being powered by both a triple expansion steam engine and a steam turbine.

Donau was requisitioned for war service under the command of Kriegsmarine-Dienststelle Hamburg and equipped with anti-aircraft weaponry and depth charges.  She was put into service transporting troops from the Eastern Front via Stettin to Oslo and back.

On 26 November 1942 Norwegian police forces under the direction of the Gestapo handed 532 Jewish prisoners to the SS at Pier 1 in Oslo harbor.  The ship was under the command of Untersturmführer Klaus Grossmann and Oberleutnant Manig.  Men and women were put in separate holds on the ship, where they were deprived of basic sanitary conditions and mistreated by the soldiers. Only 9 of the prisoners survived the Second World War. 

On or shortly before 16 January 1945, Roy Nielsen from Milorg and Max Manus from Kompani Linge planted ten limpet mines  under the waterline along a  section of the port side of the ship, while she was docked in Oslo.  The intention was for the bombs to detonate in open sea once the ship had cleared the Oslofjord but, because departure on the morning of 17 January 1945 was delayed, the bombs went off before the Donau reached Drøbak, where the captain managed to beach her. Seven years later the wreck was pulled off and towed to Bremerhaven for scrapping. These events are related in the 2008 Norwegian film Max Manus.

References

The Holocaust in Norway
Steamships of Germany
Ships of Norddeutscher Lloyd
Troop ships of Germany
World War II passenger ships of Germany
Maritime incidents in January 1945
Ship bombings
World War II shipwrecks in the North Sea
Ships built in Hamburg
1929 ships